First Glimpse is a former monthly consumer electronics magazine published by Sandhills Publishing Company in Lincoln, Nebraska, USA.

History and profile
CE Lifestyles was first published in December 2004.  It was promoted as being "For the woman with connections." The magazine was renamed as First Glimpse in 2006. The article and editorial content focuses on assisting individuals in incorporating modern technology into their lives.  The magazine offers guidance for buying and using cell phones, digital cameras, MP3 players and digital TVs.

See also
Computer magazines

References

External links

Publisher's website

Computer magazines published in the United States
Monthly magazines published in the United States
Science and technology magazines published in the United States
Consumer magazines
Home computer magazines
Magazines established in 2004
Magazines published in Nebraska
2004 establishments in Nebraska